Exerodonta abdivita is a species of frogs in the family Hylidae.

It is endemic to Mexico.

Its natural habitats are subtropical or tropical moist lowland forests, rivers, freshwater marshes, and intermittent freshwater marshes.
It is threatened by habitat loss.

Sources

Exerodonta
Amphibians described in 2000
Taxonomy articles created by Polbot